{{DISPLAYTITLE:C4H10O3}}
The molecular formula C4H10O3 (molar mass: 106.12 g/mol, exact mass: 106.0630 u) may refer to:

 1,2,4-Butanetriol
 Diethyl ether peroxide
 Diethylene glycol (DEG)
 Trimethyl orthoformate (TMOF)